Selwyn Cobbo (born 5 June 2002) is a professional rugby league footballer who plays as a er for the Brisbane Broncos in the NRL (National Rugby League).

He has played at representative level for Queensland in the State of Origin series.

Background
Cobbo was born in Cherbourg, Queensland, Australia. He attended Murgon State High School where he was the first Indigenous student to be school captain there.

Cobbo played his junior rugby league for the Cherbourg Hornets and Gympie Devils.

Cobbo is the great-great grandson of Eddie Gilbert.

Playing career

2021
In Round 13 of the 2021 NRL season, Cobbo made his first grade debut for the Brisbane Broncos on the  against St. George Illawarra Dragons at Kogarah Oval which ended in a 52–24 loss.

Cobbo played  in the 2021 Queensland Cup Grand Final for the Wynnum-Manly Seagulls, which the club ultimately lost 16-10 against the Norths Devils.

2022
In Round 7 of the 2022 NRL season, Cobbo scored two tries for Brisbane in a 34-14 victory over Canterbury.
In round 10, Cobbo scored a hat-trick in Brisbane's 38-0 victory over Manly-Warringah.  The following week in round 11, Cobbo scored a further two tries in a 36-12 victory over Newcastle. He then scored another try the following week in a 35-24 comeback victory over the Gold Coast Titans.

Following a sensational start to the year with 10 tries in 12 games, Cobbo was selected to make his State of Origin debut in Game 1 of the 2022 State of Origin series on the right , setting up a crucial try 5 minutes before halftime for centre Dane Gagai. Cobbo would play all three games in a series win for Queensland.  In round 22 of the 2022 NRL season, Cobbo scored a hat-trick in Brisbane's 28-10 victory over Newcastle.

2023
In January, Cobbo came under criticism after comments he made about Brisbane coach Kevin Walters on the Back of the 135 podcast in November 2022. Cobbo said at the time “He’s a good person and a good bloke but I don’t think he’s a good coach, He’s not the best coach but he’s alright. He does a lot for the club but the way he coaches is a bit weird". Cobbo later apologised for the comments and stated that his words were taken out of context.The Broncos fined Cobbo $15,000 over the incident.

Honours
Representative
 2022 State of Origin series Winners

References

External links
Brisbane Broncos profile

2002 births
Living people
Australian rugby league players
Brisbane Broncos players
Indigenous Australian rugby league players
Queensland Rugby League State of Origin players
Rugby league players from Queensland
Rugby league wingers